Lenigret Mallwitz (9 March 1892 – 10 July 1969) was a German painter. Her work was part of the painting event in the art competition at the 1928 Summer Olympics.

References

1892 births
1969 deaths
20th-century German painters
German women painters
Olympic competitors in art competitions
People from Bremerhaven
20th-century German women